Pieter Weening (born 5 April 1981) is a Dutch former professional road bicycle racer, who rode professionally for the  (2004–2011),  (2012–2015),  (2016–2019), and  (2020) teams.

Career
Weening was born in Harkema, Friesland.

2005
In 2005 Weening won a stage in the Tour de France. After one of the closest finishes in the Tour ever, Weening won the eighth stage just ahead of Andreas Klöden. In the same year he also won a stage in the Tour de Pologne and finished second overall, five seconds behind winner Kim Kirchen. He was named Dutch cyclist of 2005.

2011
With only a stage win in the Tour of Austria, Weening had to wait six years before a next big victory. In the Giro d'Italia, just one day after the neutralised stage due to the death of Wouter Weylandt, Weening won stage 5. Analysts described this stage as a 'Mini Tour of Lombardy'. The stage had an uphill finish and several unpaved stretches (strade bianche). Weening was the strongest on the uphill finish of a small break away and stayed just in front of the peloton. After the stage win, he was awarded the Pink leaders jersey. He gave the physical jersey awarded to him on the podium to Weylandt's family.

2013
In 2013, Weening won the Tour de Pologne after starting the time trial fifth overall, and 27 seconds down. He managed to take the lead by placing a solid performance.

2014
In 2014, Weening again won a stage in the Giro d'Italia, after also being part of the team that won the first-stage team time trial. On stage 9, he took part in the day's main breakaway and, along with Davide Malacarne, was able to stay away to the end of the stage. He outsprinted Malacarne in the closing metres, to take the third individual stage win of his career. Weening also won the Giro della Toscana from a solo attack.

2020
His short-term contract was not extended beyond the 2020 season, and Weening announced his retirement that November.

Major results

2001
 7th Overall Grand Prix Guillaume Tell
2002
 1st  Road race, National Under-23 Road Championships
 2nd GP Wielerrevue
 6th Overall Tour de l'Avenir
 10th Overall Circuit des Ardennes
2003
 1st Overall Jadranska Magistrala
1st Stage 2
 3rd La Côte Picarde
 3rd Liège–Bastogne–Liège U23
 9th Overall Tour of Austria
 10th Overall Niedersachsen Rundfahrt
2005
 1st Stage 8 Tour de France
 2nd Overall Tour de Pologne
1st Stage 6
 9th Overall Vuelta a Murcia
2006
 8th Overall Critérium International
2008
 1st Ridderronde Maastricht
 7th Overall Regio-Tour
2009
 3rd Overall Vuelta a Murcia
 4th Overall Tour de Pologne
 6th Overall Tour of Austria
1st Stage 3
2010
 2nd Road race, National Road Championships
 5th Overall Ster Elektrotoer
 8th Overall Vuelta a Murcia
 10th Overall Tour of Austria
2011
 Giro d'Italia
1st Stage 5
Held  after Stages 5–8
 6th Overall Tour de Romandie
2012
 10th Overall Tour of California
2013
 1st  Overall Tour de Pologne
 2nd Overall Tour de Langkawi
 2nd Grand Prix Impanis-Van Petegem
 6th Overall Tour of the Basque Country
 8th Overall Eneco Tour
 8th Amstel Gold Race
 8th Amstel Curaçao Race
 9th Trofeo Serra de Tramuntana
2014
 Giro d'Italia
1st Stages 1 (TTT) & 9
 1st Giro di Toscana
2015
 1st Stage 1 (TTT) Giro d'Italia
2016
 1st  Overall Tour of Norway
1st Stage 2
 1st Stage 6 Tour de Suisse
 6th Overall Tour des Fjords
2017
 1st  Mountains classification Tour de Yorkshire
 1st  Mountains classification Tour of Austria
 3rd Overall Tour of Norway
1st Stage 3
 6th Trofeo Pollenca–Port de Andratx
 7th Overall Danmark Rundt
 9th Vuelta a Murcia
2018
 1st Stage 5 Tour of Austria
 2nd Overall Tour of Croatia
 6th Overall Adriatica Ionica Race
 8th Overall Okolo Slovenska
2019
 1st Stage 2 Tour de Luxembourg
 4th Trofeo Andratx–Lloseta
 5th Classic Sud-Ardèche
 8th Trofeo Serra de Tramuntana
 10th Overall Tour of Belgium

Grand Tour general classification results timeline

References

External links

1981 births
Living people
Dutch male cyclists
Dutch Tour de France stage winners
People from Achtkarspelen
Dutch Giro d'Italia stage winners
UCI Road World Championships cyclists for the Netherlands
Cyclists from Friesland
Tour de Suisse stage winners
21st-century Dutch people
20th-century Dutch people